The Convention for the Suppression of Unlawful Acts against the Safety of Maritime Navigation or SUA Convention is a multilateral treaty by which states agree to prohibit and punish behaviour which may threaten the safety of maritime navigation.

Content
The Convention is based upon the 1971 Convention for the Suppression of Unlawful Acts Against the Safety of Civil Aviation and the Convention for the Suppression of Unlawful Seizure of Aircraft and criminalises similar behaviour in the context of maritime navigation.

The Convention criminalises the following behaviour:
Seizing control of a ship by force or threat of force;
committing an act of violence against a person on ship if it is likely to endanger the safety of the ship;
destroying or damaging a ship or its cargo in such a way that endangers the safe navigation of the ship;
placing or causing to be placed on a ship a device or substance which is likely to destroy or cause damage to the ship or its cargo;
destroying or damaging a ship's navigation facilities or interfering with their operation if it is likely to endanger the safety of the ship;
communicating information which is known to be false, thereby endangering the safety of the navigation of a ship;
injuring or killing anyone while committing 1–6;
attempting any of 1–7;
being an accomplice to any of 1–8; and
compelling another through threats to commit any of 1–9.

The Convention sets out the principle of aut dedere aut judicare—that a state party to the treaty must either (1) prosecute a person who commits one of the offences or (2) send the individual to another state that requests his or her extradition for prosecution of the same crime.

The Convention does not apply to:
A warship; or
a ship owned or operated by a State when being used as a naval auxiliary or for customs or police purposes; or
a ship which has been withdrawn from navigation or laid up.

Nothing in the convention  affects the immunities of warships and other government ships operated for non-commercial purposes.

Creation
The convention was adopted by the International Conference on the Suppression of Unlawful Acts against the Safety of Maritime Navigation at Rome on 10 March 1988. It came into force on 1 March 1992 after it had been ratified by 15 states.

Parties
As of June 2015, the convention has 166 state parties, which includes 164 UN member states plus the Cook Islands and Niue. The 166 states represent 94.5 per cent of the gross tonnage of the world's merchant fleet.

The following 29 UN member states are not party to the convention. States with coastlines have asterisks.

Protocol
The Protocol for the Suppression of Unlawful Acts against the Safety of Fixed Platforms Located on the Continental Shelf (SUA PROT) was concluded at the same time as SUA. It came into force at the same time as SUA. SUA PROT is a supplementary convention to SUA.

In London on 14 October 2005, a second supplementary protocol was introduced, called the Protocol of 2005 to the Convention for the Suppression of Unlawful Acts against the Safety of Maritime Navigation, abbreviated as "SUA 2005". It adds provisions which criminalise the use of ships to transfer or discharge biological, chemical, or nuclear weapons (excepting nuclear weapons transferred by signatories to the Treaty on the Non-Proliferation of Nuclear Weapons). It prohibits ships from discharging oil, liquefied natural gas, radioactive materials, or other hazardous or noxious substances in quantities or concentrations likely to cause death, serious injury or damage, or using them against ships involved in maritime navigation.

SUA 2005 came into force on 28 July 2010 and, as of February 2016, is ratified by 40 states.

See also
 Convention on the High Seas
 Tokyo Convention
 Hague Hijacking Convention
 Hostages Convention
 Beijing Convention

External links
Text.
Signatures and ratifications, see page 419 and further.

Admiralty law treaties
Terrorism treaties
Treaties concluded in 1988
Treaties entered into force in 1992
Treaties of the Afghan Transitional Administration
Treaties of Albania
Treaties of Algeria
Treaties of Andorra
Treaties of Antigua and Barbuda
Treaties of Argentina
Treaties of Armenia
Treaties of Australia
Treaties of Austria
Treaties of Azerbaijan
Treaties of the Bahamas
Treaties of Bahrain
Treaties of Bangladesh
Treaties of Barbados
Treaties of Belarus
Treaties of Belgium
Treaties of Benin
Treaties of Bolivia
Treaties of Bosnia and Herzegovina
Treaties of Botswana
Treaties of Brazil
Treaties of Brunei
Treaties of Bulgaria
Treaties of Burkina Faso
Treaties of Cambodia
Treaties of Canada
Treaties of Cape Verde
Treaties of Chile
Treaties of the People's Republic of China
Treaties of the Comoros
Treaties of the Republic of the Congo
Treaties of the Cook Islands
Treaties of Costa Rica
Treaties of Ivory Coast
Treaties of Croatia
Treaties of Cuba
Treaties of Cyprus
Treaties of the Czech Republic
Treaties of Denmark
Treaties of Djibouti
Treaties of Dominica
Treaties of the Dominican Republic
Treaties of Ecuador
Treaties of Egypt
Treaties of El Salvador
Treaties of Equatorial Guinea
Treaties of Estonia
Treaties of Ethiopia
Treaties of Fiji
Treaties of Finland
Treaties of France
Treaties of the Gambia
Treaties of Georgia (country)
Treaties of Germany
Treaties of East Germany
Treaties of Ghana
Treaties of Greece
Treaties of Grenada
Treaties of Guatemala
Treaties of Guinea
Treaties of Guinea-Bissau
Treaties of Guyana
Treaties of Honduras
Treaties of Hungary
Treaties of Iceland
Treaties of India
Treaties of Iran
Treaties of Iraq
Treaties of Ireland
Treaties of Israel
Treaties of Italy
Treaties of Jamaica
Treaties of Japan
Treaties of Jordan
Treaties of Kazakhstan
Treaties of Kenya
Treaties of Kiribati
Treaties of Kuwait
Treaties of Laos
Treaties of Latvia
Treaties of Lebanon
Treaties of Lesotho
Treaties of Liberia
Treaties of the Libyan Arab Jamahiriya
Treaties of Liechtenstein
Treaties of Lithuania
Treaties of Luxembourg
Treaties of Madagascar
Treaties of Malawi
Treaties of the Maldives
Treaties of Mali
Treaties of Malta
Treaties of the Marshall Islands
Treaties of Mauritania
Treaties of Mauritius
Treaties of Mexico
Treaties of the Federated States of Micronesia
Treaties of Moldova
Treaties of Monaco
Treaties of Mongolia
Treaties of Montenegro
Treaties of Morocco
Treaties of Mozambique
Treaties of Myanmar
Treaties of Namibia
Treaties of Nauru
Treaties of the Netherlands
Treaties of New Zealand
Treaties of Nicaragua
Treaties of Niger
Treaties of Nigeria
Treaties of Niue
Treaties of Norway
Treaties of Oman
Treaties of Pakistan
Treaties of Palau
Treaties of Panama
Treaties of Paraguay
Treaties of Peru
Treaties of the Philippines
Treaties of Poland
Treaties of Portugal
Treaties of Qatar
Treaties of South Korea
Treaties of Romania
Treaties of Russia
Treaties of Samoa
Treaties of San Marino
Treaties of São Tomé and Príncipe
Treaties of Saudi Arabia
Treaties of Senegal
Treaties of Serbia and Montenegro
Treaties of Seychelles
Treaties of Singapore
Treaties of Slovakia
Treaties of Slovenia
Treaties of South Africa
Treaties of Spain
Treaties of Sri Lanka
Treaties of Saint Kitts and Nevis
Treaties of Saint Lucia
Treaties of Saint Vincent and the Grenadines
Treaties of the Republic of the Sudan (1985–2011)
Treaties of Eswatini
Treaties of Sweden
Treaties of Switzerland
Treaties of Syria
Treaties of Tajikistan
Treaties of North Macedonia
Treaties of Togo
Treaties of Tonga
Treaties of Trinidad and Tobago
Treaties of Tunisia
Treaties of Turkey
Treaties of Turkmenistan
Treaties of Tuvalu
Treaties of Uganda
Treaties of Ukraine
Treaties of the United Arab Emirates
Treaties of the United Kingdom
Treaties of Tanzania
Treaties of the United States
Treaties of Uruguay
Treaties of Uzbekistan
Treaties of Vanuatu
Treaties of Vietnam
Treaties of Yemen
Treaties of Yugoslavia
1988 in Italy
International Maritime Organization treaties
Treaties extended to the Isle of Man
Treaties extended to Aruba
Treaties extended to the Caribbean Netherlands
Treaties extended to Hong Kong
Treaties extended to Jersey